Miguel Pallardó González (born 5 September 1986) is a Spanish former professional footballer who played as a defensive midfielder.

He played 68 La Liga matches in seven seasons, representing in the competition Valencia, Getafe and Levante. In 2014, he signed with Hearts.

Club career

Valencia
Born in Alaquàs, Valencian Community, Pallardó played a similar role to David Albelda as a holding midfielder. He was promoted from Valencia CF's youth academy for 2006–07, and appeared in ten La Liga games during the season after having featured once in 2004–05 (which was his debut in the competition, playing ten minutes in a 2–2 draw at RCD Espanyol on 15 May 2005).

Pallardó spent the entire 2005–06 campaign with the reserves, in Tercera División.

Getafe and Levante
Pallardó was loaned to Getafe CF in July 2007, playing 14 top-division matches in his first year. In August 2008, already owned by the Madrid-based club, he was loaned to Segunda División side Levante UD for the 2008–09 campaign, thus returning to his native region. He scored his first goal as a senior on 8 November, helping to a 2–1 home win against CD Tenerife.

After a successful season a further loan was agreed, and Pallardó was an even more important first-team member – 35 games, 2,662 minutes– as the team returned to the top flight after a two-year absence. He was again regularly used in 2010–11, and Levante finally retained their league status.

On 17 June 2011, Pallardó finally cut ties with Getafe and signed a permanent three-year deal for €200.000. During his second spell at the Estadi Ciutat de València, he failed to make his breakthrough in the starting XI, also dealing with injury problems.

On 31 January 2013, Pallardó was loaned to UD Almería of the second tier until June.

Hearts
In August 2014, Pallardó underwent a trial with FC Sochaux-Montbéliard of France, but ultimately no permanent deal was reached between both parties. On 11 September, he signed a one-year contract with Scotland's Heart of Midlothian. He made the squad for the first time two days later, remaining an unused substitute in a goalless draw away to Dumbarton.

Pallardó made his competitive debut for his new club on 4 October 2014, replacing Prince Buaben for the last 12 minutes of a 3–0 win at Queen of the South. He scored his first goal on 31 January of the following year, opening a 4–1 away victory over Alloa Athletic after five minutes.

On 29 May 2015, after contributing to his team's promotion with 23 appearances, Pallardó extended his stay at Hearts for a further season. Roughly one year later, it was announced he would be released.

International career
Pallardó was first called into the Spain under-21 team in 2007, playing twice during that year. He also represented the nation at two other youth levels.

Honours
Hearts
Scottish Championship: 2014–15

References

External links

1986 births
Living people
People from Horta Oest
Sportspeople from the Province of Valencia
Spanish footballers
Footballers from the Valencian Community
Association football midfielders
La Liga players
Segunda División players
Segunda División B players
Tercera División players
Valencia CF Mestalla footballers
Valencia CF players
Getafe CF footballers
Levante UD footballers
UD Almería players
Real Murcia players
Scottish Professional Football League players
Heart of Midlothian F.C. players
J2 League players
V-Varen Nagasaki players
Spain youth international footballers
Spain under-21 international footballers
Spanish expatriate footballers
Expatriate footballers in Scotland
Expatriate footballers in Japan
Spanish expatriate sportspeople in Scotland
Spanish expatriate sportspeople in Japan